A neighborhood shopping center (Commonwealth English: neighbourhood shopping centre) is an industry term in the United States for a shopping center with  of gross leasable area, typically anchored by a supermarket and/or large drugstore.

Versus other formats
Community centers: Slightly larger centers  with general merchandise or convenience- oriented offerings are termed as community centers or large neighborhood centers by the ICSC (International Council of Shopping Centers), who state that they typically have a "wider range of apparel and other soft goods offerings than neighborhood centers. The center is usually configured in a straight line as a strip, or may be laid out in an L or U shape, depending on the site and design."
Best Buy) incl. discount department stores (e.g. Target) and wholesale clubs (e.g. Costco). 
Strip malls: Open-air centers under  are generally considered strip malls.

Versus European terminology
In Europe, any shopping center with mostly "retail warehouse units" (UK terminology; in the US these are called "big box stores" or superstores), 5000 sqm or larger, 53,819 sq. ft., is a retail park, according to the leading real estate company Cushman & Wakefield. Therefore, some neighborhood shopping centers in the United States might be considered "retail parks" in Europe, depending on the tenant mix.

History
Before the 1930s, there were only a few examples of this type of shopping center, typically built as part of new, planned, upscale residential developments. During the 1930s the neighborhood center not only emerged as an important element of the retail landscape in the United States, but also became one of the first common building forms to be adapted for the society's widespread adoption of the automobile. Already by 1940, the neighborhood shopping center was seen as a good format for serving the shopping needs of people in suburban areas in general. Washington, D. C., was the area where different experimental forms were built.

The Bank Block in Grandview Heights, Ohio (1928) was an early neighborhood center of 30 shops built along Grandview Avenue, with parking in the back for 400 cars. Uniquely for the time, it had multiple national grocery store tenants Kroger, Piggly Wiggly, and the A&P Tea Company. The Park and Shop (1930) in Cleveland Park, Washington, D.C. was another early neighborhood center. It was anchored by Piggly Wiggly and built in an L shape with dedicated parking space for shoppers in the front, a novelty at the time. The center still exists, anchored by a Target store.

References

Retail formats